Fuse is the upcoming eleventh studio album by British duo Everything but the Girl, scheduled to be released on 21 April 2023 through Buzzin' Fly and Virgin Records. It is their first studio album in 24 years following Temperamental (1999). The album was preceded by the single "Nothing Left to Lose" on 10 January 2023, followed by "Caution to the Wind" and "Run a Red Light" in February and March, respectively.

Background
The duo began working on the album in March 2021, recording it in secret at both their home and a studio outside of Bath, England with the engineer Bruno Ellingham, with Tracey Thorn stating that they were "aware of the pressures of such a long-awaited comeback, so we tried to begin instead in a spirit of open-minded playfulness".

Ben Watt told NME that they "wanted to come back with something modern-sounding. [...] We just wanted to make a piece of work that would sound great now in 2023. That was the driver." He also elaborated that Fuse is not "a pandemic album or a lockdown album – it just struck us that the time was right after 23 years of waiting", also echoing Thorn's statement that the intention was to be "a bit playful and experimental to see what happens. There wasn't a masterplan."

Music
The album will contain a mix of electronic and acoustic tracks, with a statement describing it as a "modern take on the lustrous electronic soul" that the duo produced before their 2000 hiatus. The tracks "When You Mess Up" and "Interior Space" began as "improvised piano ballads" Watt recorded on his iPhone.

Track listing

References

2023 albums
Everything but the Girl albums
Upcoming albums
Virgin Records albums